P10 or P-10 may refer to:

Aircraft 
 Boulton Paul P.10, a British experimental aircraft
 Curtiss XP-10, an American experimental fighter aircraft
 Piaggio P.10, an Italian reconnaissance aircraft

Military 
 Grendel P10, a .380 pistol
 Heckler & Koch P10, a pistol
 P-10 radar, a Soviet radar system
 Södermanland Regiment (armoured), of the Swedish Army

Surface vehicles 
 Infiniti G20 (P10), a compact executive car
 Nissan Primera (P10), a family car
 Norton P10, an experimental motorcycle
 Prussian P 10, a steam locomotive
 Toyota Publica (P10), a subcompact car

Other uses 
 P10 (protocol), an extension to the Internet Relay Chat protocol 
 Huawei P10, a smartphone
 Jalan Batu Maung, a road in Malaysia
 Papyrus 10, a biblical manuscript
 P10, an iRiver portable music player